Ankhwennefer ( "May Onnophris live"), also known as Ankhmakis, was the successor of Horwennefer, a rebel ruler who controlled much of Upper Egypt during the reigns of Ptolemies IV and V. His rule lasted from approximately 200 to 186 BC.

Reign 
Ankhwennefer succeeded Horwennefer as pharaoh in Upper Egypt between 201 and 199; the exact date remains unclear. His background is also unknown, but he might have been a relative of Horwennefer. An inscription at Philae hints at Ankhwennefer being Horwennefer's son. In any case, Ankhwennefer encountered a difficult situation at the start of his reign. Horwennefer had been killed in battle and the rebels lost their capital of Thebes either shortly before or after Ankhwennefer's accession. The Ptolemaic army garrisoned not just Thebes, but even the town of Syene further to the south. According to Egyptologist Toby Wilkinson, Ankhwennefer "daringly" marched his remaining forces into the north, where he plundered and devastated as much as possible to disrupt the Ptolemaic supply lines. The rebel pharaoh was probably aided by the outbreak of new anti-Ptolemaic rebellions in the Nile Delta and the Fifth Syrian War between the Ptolemaic Kingdom and the Seleucid Empire. In 200 BC, much of the Ptolemaic army was destroyed by the Seleucids in the Battle of Panium; this allowed Ankhwennefer to re-strengthen his regime. The rebels' northward offensive succeeded in forcing the Ptolemaic garrison to retreat from Thebes to its southernmost strongholds.

Despite having regained the Thebaid, Ankhwennefer remained beset not just by Ptolemaic loyalists, but also by an invasion by the Kingdom of Kush from the south. The latter were exploiting the chaos in Egypt to expand their realm along the Nile, particularly in the area known as Dodekaschoinos. In 197 or 196 BC, the Ptolemies launched a counter-offensive and retook Lykopolis (modern Asyut) in the Delta; this city may or may not have been held by rebels loyal to Ankhwennefer. Afterwards, Ptolemy V was officially crowned Pharaoh in Memphis. Deprived of the rich areas in northern Egypt, Ankhwennefer's force was gradually weakened. The Kingdom of Kush also continued its pressure from the south. The Ptolemaic army advanced southward, retaking Sauty province after heavy fighting, and capturing Thebes in 191. Ankhwennefer retreated to the border of Kush, and managed to enlist Nubian troops for his cause. Historian Alan B. Lloyd argued that these Nubians were possibly interested in protecting the Amun temples at Thebes. His last stronghold might have been Syene. The war continued until  186 BC, when Ankhwennefer's Egyptian-Nubian army was decisively defeated. Ankhwennefer's son was killed in the fighting, but he was captured.

Ankhwennefer was imprisoned, but might have been spared by Ptolemy V after Egyptian priests intervened on his behalf. Many southern rebels were granted amnesties. In the following months, the Ptolemaic army wiped out the remaining rebels in the Delta.

Overall, little is known about the details of his reign as most of the records thereof were destroyed.

See also
 List of pharaohs

References

Works cited

Further reading
 Robert Steven Bianchi, Daily life of the Nubians, Greenwood Press, 2004, p. 224
 Joseph Mélèze-Modrzejewski, The Jews of Egypt: From Rameses II to Emperor Hadrian, Princeton University Press 1997, p. 150
 Willy Clarysse (Katholieke Universiteit Leuven), The Great Revolt of the Egyptians, Lecture held at the Center for the Tebtunis Papyri, University of California at Berkeley,  on March 16, 2004.

2nd-century BC Pharaohs
Non-dynastic pharaohs
2nd-century BC rulers in Africa
Egyptian rebels
180s BC deaths
Year of birth unknown
People of the Ptolemaic Kingdom
Ancient rebels